The Men's sprint competition at the 2020 FIL World Luge Championships was held on 14 February 2020.

Results
The qualification was held at 11:15 and the final at 15:23.

References

Men's sprint